In Line is the debut album by Bill Frisell, released on ECM in 1983. It contains four solo performances by Frisell and five duets with bassist Arild Andersen.

Reception
The Rolling Stone Album Guide called the album "a lusciously reflective collection."

Track listing
All compositions by Bill Frisell.

 "Start" – 5:55
 "Throughout" – 6:52
 "Two Arms" – 4:00
 "Shorts" – 3:08
 "Smile on You" – 4:07
 "The Beach" – 6:06
 "In Line" – 4:36
 "Three" – 4:17
 "Godson Song" – 3:57

Personnel
Bill Frisell – guitar
Arild Andersen (1, 4, 6, 8 & 9) – bass

References

External links 

 video interview with Bill Frisell about recording On Line

1983 debut albums
Bill Frisell albums
ECM Records albums
Albums produced by Manfred Eicher